Miguel Ferrer (1591–1659) was a Roman Catholic prelate who served as Bishop of Tui (1657–1659).

Biography
Miguel Ferrer was born in Pamplona, Spain in 1591.
On 10 September 1656, he was selected by the King of Spain and confirmed by Pope Alexander VII on 12 March 1657 as Bishop of Tui.
On 12 August 1657, he was consecrated bishop. 
He served as Bishop of Tui until his death on 23 March 1659.

References

External links and additional sources
 (for Chronology of Bishops) 
 (for Chronology of Bishops) 

17th-century Roman Catholic bishops in Spain
Bishops appointed by Pope Alexander VII
1591 births
1659 deaths